Woodside (Aberdeen) railway station served the parish of Woodside, Aberdeen, Scotland from 1858 to 1937 on the Great North of Scotland Railway.

History 
The station opened on 1 January 1858 by the Great North of Scotland Railway. A signal box opened in 1887 but it closed in 1912. It reopened shortly after but closed again in 1928. The station closed to both passengers and goods traffic on 5 April 1937.

References

External links 

Disused railway stations in Aberdeenshire
Former Great North of Scotland Railway stations
Railway stations in Great Britain opened in 1858
Railway stations in Great Britain closed in 1937
1858 establishments in Scotland
1937 disestablishments in Scotland